Charles Morgan Williams  (21 April 1878 – 4 August 1970) was a mayor and Member of Parliament for Kaiapoi in Canterbury, New Zealand.

Early years: farming and business
C. Morgan Williams was born in North Wales in 1878, and worked as a letter sorter in London. There he was active in the Battersea Branch of the British Social Democratic Federation and later secretary of the Clapham Branch.

He came to New Zealand in 1902, and worked as a farm labourer in the Kaiapoi district until 1906, when he bought and leased land in the Tram Road area and grew potatoes. On the peat land he developed an extensive drainage system to allow dairy farming and founded the Maesgwyn herd of pedigree Ayrshire cattle. Williams purchased the property known as "Waverley" from Richard Evans in 1925. He also established the grain and produce business of C. Morgan Williams and Son in Charles Street, Kaiapoi.

Afforestation
Morgan Williams was closely associated with afforestation at Kaiapoi for over fifty years. He undertook block plantings on Council Reserves, and at Ohoka, Clarkville and Mandeville. In 1939 he was appointed by the Kaiapoi Borough Council as honorary supervisor of forests. At a public meeting in 1955, Williams received a presentation from the mayor Norman Kirk, in recognition of his service to the borough and his care of 245 acres of forest reserves.

Public service

Morgan Williams local body activities began with his election to the Kaiapoi Borough Council in 1927, he was elected mayor in 1947 and served a term.

He joined the Social Democratic Party in 1913. He stood unsuccessfully for Labour in Kaiapoi in 1919, and 1925, and Mid-Canterbury in 1928.

He represented the Canterbury electorate of Kaiapoi from 1935 to 1946, when he was defeated standing for St Albans.

Williams was appointed a Member of the Order of the British Empire, for public services, in the 1956 Queen's Birthday Honours, but for the rest of his life, he did not wear the medal as he considered it a community, and not a personal commendation. Williams was a chairman of the Dairy Produce Marketing Commission (Logan, p. 152).

According to Barry Gustafson, he was regarded by some observers and colleagues as somewhat eccentric, but undoubtedly intelligent and able, though in accusing Savage of favouring fellow Catholics (from 1935) he was bigoted. He was one of John A. Lees closest caucus friends. Ormond Wilson, in his "An Outsider Looks Back: Reflections on Experience" details Morgan Williams clash with Walter Nash on the Universal Family Benefit ("the well-to-do already had theirs-tax rebates"), and Bob Semple on freedom of speech laws with Semple boasting would "not allow Communist literature in Public Work Camps".

Morgan Williams died in 1970. By his personal request, the funeral service was conducted by a former Minister of Finance, and parliamentary colleague, the Hon. Sir Arnold Nordmeyer.

A son, Charles Thomas Williams, was also involved in local body affairs in Kaiapoi. Charles Williams was first elected to the council in 1937, serving at different times for more than twenty years altogether. He was deputy mayor under Norman Kirk from 1953 to 1957 and assumed the mayoralty when Kirk entered Parliament.

A grandson, also called Morgan Williams, was a Parliamentary Commissioner for the Environment.

Quotes
On Public Service
In 1965, Morgan Williams made his last attendance at the Kaiapoi Council Chambers (at the installation of the newly elected Council) and said: "the willingness of citizens to give their services free to the community was the very foundation of the democratic system of life".
(Morgan Williams Papers, Alexander Turnbull Library, MS 998, Wellington).

On Peter Fraser
"I have heard it said that he (Peter Fraser) forgets nothing and forgives nothing".
"As a party tactician Peter Fraser has no equal, he knows when to bounce and bluster his way out of a difficulty".
(Quoted in Mary Logan, Nordy: Arnold Nordmeyer, Wellington, Steele Roberts 2008, p. 155).

Book
Morgan Williams wrote a book on his life, which is held at the Canterbury Museum Research Centre. It is a fascinating account of his early struggles and personal and political philosophy.

Notes

References

Obituary, "The Press" 7 August 1970.

New Zealand farmers
New Zealand businesspeople
New Zealand Labour Party MPs
Social Democratic Party (New Zealand) politicians
Welsh emigrants to New Zealand
1878 births
1970 deaths
Mayors of places in Canterbury, New Zealand
People from Kaiapoi
Deputy mayors of places in New Zealand
Members of the New Zealand House of Representatives
New Zealand MPs for South Island electorates
New Zealand Members of the Order of the British Empire
Unsuccessful candidates in the 1946 New Zealand general election
Unsuccessful candidates in the 1925 New Zealand general election
Unsuccessful candidates in the 1922 New Zealand general election
Unsuccessful candidates in the 1919 New Zealand general election